Noel Dermot Dobbin, businessman and former team president of the St. John's Fog Devils of the Quebec Major Junior Hockey League, was born St. John's, Newfoundland.

Dobbin, Derm as he is commonly known, and his brother Craig Dobbin share many business interests among which is the franchise for the St, John's Fog Devils.  Both Derm and Craig proved to be savvy negotiators in obtaining a lease for Mile One Stadium amidst the protracted and sometimes rancorous negotiations with the City of St. John's.

Dobbin formed N.D. Dobbin Limited in 1976, a company with business interests in contracting, real estate, property management and hotel operations.

See also
List of people of Newfoundland and Labrador 
List of communities in Newfoundland and Labrador

External links
ND Dobbin Ltd.

People from St. John's, Newfoundland and Labrador
Canadian people of Irish descent
Living people
Year of birth missing (living people)